State Route 390 (SR 390) is a state highway in the cities of Bluff City and Bristol in Sullivan County, Tennessee.

Route description
SR 390 begins at SR 44 in Bluff City and goes north and cross over the South Fork Holston River and Boone Lake. It continues north to SR 394 and turns left to become concurrent with it before coming to an end at an interchange with US 11E/US 19. SR 394 continues straight.

Junction list

References

390
Transportation in Sullivan County, Tennessee
Bristol, Tennessee